Karthika Srinivas R is an Indian film editor who predominantly works in Tollywood films. He is best known for his works in the films Swamy Ra Ra (2013), 1: Nenokkadine (2014), Karthikeya (2014), Antariksham 9000 KMPH (2018) and Mathu Vadalara (2019).

Career 
Karthika Srinivas started his career as an editor in the film 100% Love (2011) which earned him recognition. Later his works in critically acclaimed films like 1: Nenokkadine (2014), Karthikeya (2014) and Antariksham 9000 KMPH (2018).

He also worked in short films Be Humane, LIFE’ A true blessing, Machan Enaku Iniki Kalyanam, Kadhile Kaalam Kalala and Middle Finger.

Filmography

As editor 
All films are in Telugu unless otherwise noted

References

External links 
 

Indian film editors
Telugu film editors
Film editors from Andhra Pradesh
Living people
Telugu people
Year of birth missing (living people)